Tomm or TOMM may refer to:

Train of Many Metals, New York Transit Museum nostalgia train
Test of Memory Malingering, visual memory recognition test
ACM Transactions on Multimedia Computing, Communications, and Applications, quarterly scientific journal 
Translocase of the outer mitochondrial membrane, protein-encoding human genes
TOMM20
TOMM22
TOMM34
TOMM40
TOMM40L
TOMM70A

People
Tomm Coker (born 1972), American comic book artist and film director/writer
Tomm Kristiansen (born 1950), Norwegian author and journalist
Tomm Moore (born 1977), Irish filmmaker, animator, illustrator and comics artist
Tomm Murstad (1915–2001), Norwegian skier, coach and business man
Tomm Polos (born 1988), American actor, humorist and writer
Tomm Warneke (born 1961), American professional tennis player
 Tomm., taxonomic author abbreviation of Muzio Tommasini (1794–1879), Austrian botanist

See also
Tom (disambiguation)
Tommy (disambiguation)